Marc Murphy may refer to:
 Marc Murphy (footballer)
 Marc Murphy (chef)

See also
 Mark Murphy (disambiguation)